Walter William Shaw (1868 – 10 May 1927) was a British Conservative Party politician.

He was elected at the 1924 general election as Member of Parliament (MP) for Westbury in Wiltshire, having unsuccessfully fought the seat in 1923. He had previously contested Houghton-le-Spring at the 1922 general election.

However, he did not complete a full Parliament, dying in office in May 1927, aged 58. He is buried in Brookwood Cemetery.

References

External links 
 

1868 births
1927 deaths
Conservative Party (UK) MPs for English constituencies
UK MPs 1924–1929
Burials at Brookwood Cemetery